Frank Vining Smith (1879 - July 30, 1967) was an American marine painter who specialized in sailing ships. His paintings can be seen at the Eastern Yacht Club and the Grosse Pointe Yacht Club.

References

1879 births
1967 deaths
People from Whitman, Massachusetts
Art Students League of New York alumni
American male painters
American marine artists
Painters from Massachusetts
19th-century American painters
19th-century American male artists
20th-century American painters
20th-century American male artists